Miser's Dream is a magic routine where the magician produces coins from the air (and often other places) and drops them into a receptacle they are holding, usually a metal bucket. It has also been called "Aerial Treasury". It was invented in the 19th century and popularized by T. Nelson Downs circa 1895.

The trick is considered a crowd-pleaser, with an easy to follow plot based on a common desire. Its secret method usually involves palming.

Selected Performers
 Al Flosso
 Jeff McBride
 Penn & Teller (variation producing coins from a fish tank)
 Robert-Houdin
 T. Nelson Downs (using a hat)

See also
 Coin snatching

References

Coin magic